Bay View Gardens is a village in Woodford County, Illinois, United States. The population was 378 at the 2010 census, up from 366 in 2000. The village is part of the Peoria, Illinois Metropolitan Statistical Area.

Geography
Bay View Gardens is located at  (40.809826, -89.519091).

Demographics

As of the census of 2000, there were 366 people, 141 households, and 105 families residing in the village. The racial makeup of the village was 99.18% White and 0.27% African American. Native American, Hispanic, or Latino of any race were 0.55% of the population.

There were 141 households, out of which 38.3% had children under the age of 18 living with them, 56.7% were married couples living together, 12.8% had a female householder with no husband present, and 25.5% were non-families. 24.1% of all households were made up of individuals, and 9.9% had someone living alone who was 65 years of age or older. The average household size was 2.60 and the average family size was 3.06.

In the village, the population was spread out, with 28.1% under the age of 18, 7.1% from 18 to 24, 29.2% from 25 to 44, 24.0% from 45 to 64, and 11.5% who were 65 years of age or older. The median age was 38 years. For every 100 females, there were 105.6 males. For every 100 females age 18 and over, there were 94.8 males.

The median income for a household in the village was $32,750, and the median income for a family was $37,614. Males had a median income of $32,083 versus $23,194 for females. The per capita income for the village was $15,230. About 5.7% of families and 5.3% of the population were below the poverty line, including 6.7% of those under age 18 and none of those age 65 or over.

References

Villages in Illinois
Villages in Woodford County, Illinois
Peoria metropolitan area, Illinois